The Holy Spirit Adoration Sisters (SSpSAP) are a Roman Catholic religious institute. The nuns live a contemplative life, focused on perpetual adoration of the Blessed Sacrament, offering intercessory prayers for the world 24 hours a day. Inside the enclosure the nuns wear rose-colored tunics with their habits symbolizing their joy for the Holy Spirit. As a consequence of these habits these nuns are named in the vernacular the "pink sisters".

The congregation was founded in 1896 in the Netherlands by Arnold Janssen, a German diocesan priest who had first founded in 1875 the Society of the Divine Word in the Dutch border village of Steyl, and in 1889 the Missionary Sisters Servants of the Holy Spirit. Later, Janssen formed the Holy Spirit of Perpetual Adoration congregation so that the missionaries that he had already formed could be supported by prayer. Janssen was canonized on October 5, 2003, by Pope John Paul II.

Mary Michael was Janssen's first Holy Spirit of Perpetual Adoration Superior of the convent in Steyl. The first convent abroad was established in Philadelphia, Pennsylvania, United States in 1915 by Mary Michael (Adolfine Tönnies) (1862–1934), upon the invitation of Edmond Francis Prendergast. Mary Michael grew the convents in many locations, where they continued to grow after her death on Feb. 25, 1934 in Steyl.  On Feb. 25, 2015 the Holy See gave approval for the beatification process for Mary Michael. The motherhouse was later moved from Steyl to Bad Driburg, Germany.

Currently, there are 22 convents located in Argentina, Brazil, Chile, Germany, India, Indonesia, the Netherlands, the Philippines, Poland, Slovakia, Togo, and the United States. They are supported solely by donations from visitors and other private parties.

Literature 
 Anton Freitag, Tabernakelwacht und Weltmission. Steyl 1918 (1921 2nd ed.)
 Anton Freitag, Tabernakelwacht en wereldmissie. Uden 1923.
 Burning lamps : Mother Mary Michaele : co-foundress Sister-Servants of the Holy Spirit of Perpetual Adoration, 1862-1934. St. Louis, 1968. 183 pp.
 Karl Müller SVD, Kontemplation und Mission. Steyler Anbetungsschwestern 1896-1996,Steyler Verlag: Nettetal 1996,  XII + 532 pp. + Bilddokumentation, 
 Karl Müller SVD, Contemplation and Mission. Sister Servants of the Holy Spirit of Perpetual Adoration 1896-1996,  translated by Frank Mansfield SVD, 448 pp., Steyler Verlag: Nettetal (Germany) 1998, 
 Josef Alt SVD, Journey in Faith. The Missionary Life of Arnold Janssen, Studia Instituti Missiologici SVD 78, Steyler Verlag: Nettetal 2002, XVIII + 1078 S.,

References

External links
 Holy Spirit Adoration Sisters in Lincoln, NE
Holy Spirit Adoration Sisters in Philadelphia, PA
Holy Spirit Adoration Sisters in St. Louis, MO
Holy Spirit Adoration Sisters in Utrecht, Netherlands
Holy Spirit Adoration Sisters in Poland
Picture of the Sisters

Catholic female orders and societies
Religious organizations established in 1896
Catholic religious institutes established in the 19th century